Harvey William Gentry (May 27, 1926 – July 1, 2018) was an American professional baseball outfielder who played for ten years in the minor leagues, from 1947 through 1956, and appeared briefly in the Major Leagues for the  New York Giants.

Gentry made the Giants' roster at the outset of the 1954 season, after a strong 1953 campaign with Double-A Nashville. At the time, MLB clubs were allowed to carry 28 players during the first month of the regular season before cutting their rosters to the standard 25-man quota. Gentry's tenure occurred during this early-season period. He appeared in five games, all as a pinch hitter, and garnered one hit (a single off Max Surkont of the Pittsburgh Pirates on April 21) and one base on balls. He was credited with one run batted in. The Giants went on to win the National League pennant and 1954 World Series—but Gentry spent the remainder of the year, and his career, in the minors.

He died on July 1, 2018 at the age of 92.

References

1926 births
2018 deaths
Baseball players from Winston-Salem, North Carolina
Bristol Twins players
Columbia Reds players
Dallas Eagles players
Fort Smith Giants players
Jacksonville Braves players
Knoxville Smokies players
Minneapolis Millers (baseball) players
Nashville Vols players
New York Giants (NL) players
Ottawa A's players
Savannah Redlegs players